The Myanmar Accountancy Council (abbreviated MAC) is the national professional accounting body of Burma (Myanmar). MAC began as the Burma Accountancy Council (BAC), which was enacted by the Revolutionary Council's 1972 Burma Accountancy Law (1972) on 12 January 1972. On 8 March 1994, the State Law and Order Restoration Council replaced the Accounting Law, which established an Office of the Auditor General of the Union (OAG) that acts as the Secretariat of the Myanmar Accountancy Council . MAC is the nation's conferring body for accountancy practice and licenses, including the Certified Public Accountant and Diploma in Accounting.

See also
 Office of the Auditor General (Burma)
 Myanmar Institute of Certified Public Accountants

References

External links
 Official website

Professional accounting bodies
Professional associations based in Myanmar
Organizations established in 1972
1972 establishments in Burma